Emoia cyanura, the copper-tailed skink, is a species of skink. It is found in Borneo and South Pacific islands.

Names
It is known as kagisi in the Rennellese language of the Solomon Islands.

References

cyanura
Reptiles of the Solomon Islands
Reptiles described in 1830
Taxa named by René Lesson